is a Japanese artist, writer and animator. He is a member of gímik, along with Keiji Gotoh and Megumi Kadonosono, and is responsible for composing the scenarios and writing most of the episodic screenplays for their anime, and for writing some of the related manga and light novels. Some of his major works in illustration include Generator Gawl, Kiddy Grade, and Avenger.

Works

Anime television series 

 Generator Gawl (1998): Series composition, screenplay
 Space Pirate Mito (1999): screenplay
 Dai-Guard (1999): Science fiction concept, screenplay (episodes 14, 19, and 20)
 Love Hina (2000): screenplay
 Sister Princess (2001): stage manager
 Full Metal Panic! (2002): screenplay
 Magical Shopping Arcade Abenobashi (2002): setting design
 Kiddy Grade (2002): Series composition, Screenplay (episodes 1–3, 6, 8, 10–11, 15–17, and 20–24), Storyboards (episodes 9, 14, 16, and 20),  Key animation (episodes 1, 10, and 20), Eyecatch illustration (episode 22)
 Avenger (2003): Series composition, screenplay
 Uta Kata (2004): Series composition, screenplay
 Kishin Taisen Gigantic Formula (2007): Series composition, screenplay, Storyboards (episodes 12, 16, 22, and 25)
 Kiddy Girl-and (2009): Series composition, screenplay
 Shin-Men (2010): screenplay
 Freezing (2011): setting supervisor
 Crayon Shin-chan (2012): screenplay
 Freezing Vibration (2013): setting design, monitor design, key animation
 Dai-Shogun - Great Revolution (2014): scene designer, monitor design
 The Silver Guardian (2017): Series composition, screenplay
 Cardfight!! Vanguard GZ (2017): unit design 
 Dies Irae: To the Ring Reincarnation (2018): screenplay
 Fairy Tail (2019): dragon design
 A Certain Scientific Accelerator (2019): prop design, storyboards
 Do You Love Your Mom and Her Two-Hit Multi-Target Attacks? (2019): prop design, storyboards
 Yu-Gi-Oh! Sevens (2020): monster design
 Mewkledreamy (2020): storyboards

OVAs 

 Agent Aika (1997): mechanical design
 Labyrinth of Flames (2000): mechanical design
 éX-Driver (2001): mechanical design
 Fragtime (2019): background art

Movies 

 Crayon Shin-chan: The Legend Called Buri Buri 3 Minutes Charge (2005): screenplay, storyboards
 Crayon Shin-chan: The Legend Called: Dance! Amigo! (2006): storyboards
 Kiddy Grade -Ignition- (April 2007): Series composition, screenplay
 Kiddy Grade -Maelstrom- (June 2007): Series composition, screenplay
 Kiddy Grade -Truth Dawn- (September 2007): Series composition, screenplay

Manga 

 Kiddy Grade Reverse (2003), author
 Kiddy Girl-and Pure (2009), author

Novels 

 Kiddy Grade Pr. (2001), illustrator
 Kiddy Grade (2002), author
 Gemini Knives (2006), author
 Kiddy Girl-and (2010), author

References

External links

 
1965 births
Japanese animators
Japanese writers
Living people